SERT can refer to:

Teams
 Special Emergency Reaction Team, part of the Portland Police Bureau
 Seabee Engineer Reconnaissance Team, an organizational unit in the United States Navy
 Special Emergency Response Team, a former tactical unit of the Royal Canadian Mounted Police
 Special Emergency Response Team (Queensland), the tactical unit of the Queensland Police Service in Australia
 Special Emergency Response Team, a unit of the Pennsylvania State Police

Other uses
 Serotonin transporter, a protein that transports serotonin from the synaptic cleft back to the presynaptic neuron
 Space Electric Rocket Test or SERT-1, a probe used by NASA to test ion thruster design
 Server Efficiency Rating Tool, a computer performance analysis tool

See also
 Sert (disambiguation)